Difaa Riadhi Baladiat Tadjenanet, more commonly known as DRB Tadjenanet, is a football club based in Tadjenanet, Algeria. The club was founded in 1971 and its colours are blue and white. Their home stadium, Lahoua Smaïl Stadium, has a capacity of some 9,000 spectators.

Honours

Domestic competitions
 Algerian Ligue Professionnelle 2
Runner-up (1): 2014–15

Current squad

Notable players

Managers

  Liamine Bougherara (July 1, 2013–)

References

 
Football clubs in Algeria
Mila Province
Association football clubs established in 1971
1971 establishments in Algeria